Stockholm International School (SIS) provides an international education in English to approximately 700 students aged 3–18 in the heart of Sweden's capital. Offering the International Primary Curriculum and International Baccalaureate Middle Years and Diploma Programmes, the school year takes place between mid-August to mid-June and has a minimal instructional period of 178 days, divided into two semesters. SIS is situated next to St. Johannes Church in the centre of Stockholm. As of 2021, the head of the school is María (Marisa) Isabel León.

History
Gisela Dietz founded the English School, which initially in 1951 occupied a campus on Djurgården. The school had 58 students from 15 countries by the end of that year. The school was renamed to Anglo-American School of Stockholm in 1964 and then to International School of Stockholm in 1978. The student body numbered 288 by 1967, when SIS moved to its current location. The International School of Stockholm sought to have the International Baccalaureate Programme implemented at the school in 2000 and the first IB students started at the school in 2001. In 2004, the school changed its name to Stockholm International School.

Curricula at Stockholm International School

The International Primary Curriculum (IPC) - for students aged 3 to 12 - focuses on the development of the whole child in the classroom and in the world outside.

The International Baccalaureate Middle Years Programme (MYP) - for students aged 11 to 16 - provides a framework of academic challenge and life skills, achieved through embracing and transcending traditional school subjects.

The International Baccalaureate Diploma Programme (DP) - for students aged 16 to 19 - is a demanding two-year curriculum leading to final examinations and a qualification that is welcomed by leading universities around the world.

References

External links
 

Schools in Stockholm
International Baccalaureate schools in Sweden
International schools in Sweden
Private schools in Sweden
Education in Stockholm
Educational institutions established in 1951
1951 establishments in Sweden